Pedra Branca is a municipality in the state of Ceará, Brazil.

References

External links
Municipal web site

Municipalities in Ceará